Naringenin is a flavorless, colorless flavanone, a type of flavonoid. It is the predominant flavanone in grapefruit, and is found in a variety of fruits and herbs.

Structure 
Naringenin has the skeleton structure of a flavanone with three hydroxy groups at the 4', 5, and 7 carbons. It may be found both in the aglycol form, naringenin, or in its glycosidic form, naringin, which has the addition of the disaccharide neohesperidose attached via a glycosidic linkage at carbon 7.

Like the majority of flavanones, naringenin has a single chiral center at carbon 2, although the optical purity is variable. Racemization of S(-)-naringenin has been shown to occur fairly quickly.

Sources and bioavailability
Naringenin and its glycoside has been found in a variety of herbs and fruits, including grapefruit, bergamot, sour orange, tart cherries, tomatoes, cocoa, Greek oregano, water mint, as well as in beans. Ratios of naringenin to naringin vary among sources, as do enantiomeric ratios.

The naringenin-7-glucoside form seems less bioavailable than the aglycol form.

Grapefruit juice can provide much higher plasma concentrations of naringenin than orange juice. Also found in grapefruit is the related compound kaempferol, which has a hydroxyl group next to the ketone group.

Naringenin can be absorbed from cooked tomato paste. There are 3.8 mg of naringenin in 150 grams of tomato paste.

Biosynthesis and metabolism 
It is derived from malonyl CoA and 4-coumaroyl CoA. The latter is derived from phenylalanine. The resulting tetraketide is acted on by chalcone synthase to give the chalcone that then undergoes ring-closure to naringenin.

The enzyme naringenin 8-dimethylallyltransferase uses dimethylallyl diphosphate and (−)-(2S)-naringenin to produce diphosphate and 8-prenylnaringenin. Cunninghamella elegans, a fungal model organism of the mammalian metabolism, can be used to study the naringenin sulfation.

Potential biological effects

Alzheimer's disease 
Naringenin is being researched as a potential treatment for Alzheimer's disease. Naringenin has been demonstrated to improve memory and reduce amyloid and tau proteins in a study using a mouse model of Alzheimer's disease. The effect is believed to be due to a protein present in neurons known as CRMP2 that naringenin binds to.

Antibacterial, antifungal, and antiviral 
Naringenin has an antimicrobial effect on S. epidermidis, as well as Staphylococcus aureus, Bacillus subtilis, Micrococcus luteus, and Escherichia coli. Further research has added evidence for antimicrobial effects against Lactococcus lactis, lactobacillus acidophilus, Actinomyces naeslundii, Prevotella oralis, Prevotella melaninogencia, Porphyromonas gingivalis, as well as yeasts such as Candida albicans, Candida tropicalis, and Candida krusei. There is also evidence of antibacterial effects on H. pylori, though naringenin has not been shown to have any inhibition on urease activity of the microbe.

Naringenin has also been shown to reduce hepatitis C virus production by infected hepatocytes (liver cells) in cell culture. This seems to be secondary to naringenin's ability to inhibit the secretion of very-low-density lipoprotein by the cells. The antiviral effects of naringenin are currently under clinical investigation. Reports of antiviral effects on polioviruses, HSV-1 and HSV-2 have also been made, though replication of the viruses has not been inhibited. In in vitro experiments Naringenin also showed a strong antiviral activity against SARS-CoV-2.

Anti-inflammatory 
Despite evidence of anti-inflammatory activity of naringin, the anti-inflammatory activity of naringenin has been observed to be poor to nonexistent.

Antioxidant 
Naringenin has been shown to have significant antioxidant properties. It has been shown to reduce oxidative damage to DNA in vitro and in animal studies.

Anticancer 
Cytotoxicity has been induced reportedly by naringenin in cancer cells from breast, stomach, liver, cervix, pancreas, and colon tissues, along with leukaemia cells. The mechanisms behind inhibition of human breast carcinoma growth have been examined, and two theories have been proposed. The first theory is that naringenin inhibits aromatase, thus reducing growth of the tumor. The second mechanism proposes that interactions with estrogen receptors is the cause behind the modulation of growth. New derivatives of naringenin were found to be active against multidrug-resistant cancer.

Additional reading
inhibitory effect on the human cytochrome P450 isoform CYP1A2 resulting in delayed clearance of substances and protective effect against P4501A2-activated protoxicants.

Naringenin also produces BDNF-dependent antidepressant-like effects in mice.

Naringenin has been reported to induce apoptosis in preadipocytes.
Naringenin seems to protect LDLR-deficient mice from the obesity effects of a high-fat diet.
Naringenin lowers the plasma and hepatic cholesterol concentrations by suppressing HMG-CoA reductase and ACAT in rats fed a high-cholesterol diet.
Naringenin has been demonstrated to improve memory and reduce amyloid and tau proteins in a study using a mouse model of Alzheimer's disease.

References 

Aromatase inhibitors
Delta-opioid receptor antagonists
Flavanones
Resorcinols
Kappa-opioid receptor antagonists
Mu-opioid receptor antagonists
Progestogens
Phytoestrogens
Histidine decarboxylase inhibitors
3-Hydroxypropenals